Senator Staggers may refer to:

Harley O. Staggers Jr. (born 1951), West Virginia State Senate
Kermit Staggers (1947–2019), South Dakota State Senate